Filip Taleski (born 28 March 1996) is a Macedonian handball player for RK Vardar 1961 and the  Macedonian national team.

He participated at the 2017 World Men's Handball Championship, as well as at the 2017 Men's Junior World Handball Championship.

Honours
 Rhein-Neckar Löwen
German Handball League: (2016–17)
German Handball Cup: (2017–18)
RK Vardar
 Macedonian Handball Super League Winner:2021, 2022
 Macedonian Handball Cup Winner''':2021, 2022

References

External links

1996 births
Living people
Macedonian male handball players
People from Kruševo
Expatriate handball players
Macedonian expatriate sportspeople in Germany
Handball-Bundesliga players
Rhein-Neckar Löwen players